Viachaslau Bokhan (born 7 April 1996) is a Belarusian handball player for Dinamo București and the Belarusian national team. He participated at the 2018 European Men's Handball Championship.

References

External links

1996 births
Living people
Belarusian male handball players
CS Dinamo București (men's handball) players
Sportspeople from Vitebsk Region
Belarusian expatriate sportspeople in Romania